Mount Helena may refer to:

Mount Helena, Western Australia, a suburb of Perth.
Mount Helena (British Columbia), a mountain in British Columbia.
Mount Helena City Park, a mountain and city park in Helena, Montana.